Oktyabrsky District is an administrative district (raion) of Perm Krai, Russia; one of the thirty-three in the krai. Municipally, it is incorporated as Oktyabrsky Municipal District. It is located in the southeast of the krai. Its administrative center is the urban locality (a work settlement) of Oktyabrsky. Population:  The population of the administrative center accounts for 32.3% of the district's total population.

History
It was established on July 10, 1931 as Schuchye-Ozyorsky District, by merging Almazovsky and Bogorodsky Districts of Ural Oblast. It was given its present name on July 15, 1960. On February 1, 1963, the district was its territory was merged into Chernushinsky District, but on January 12, 1965 it was restored.

Demographics
Ethnic composition:
Russians: 59.6%
Tatars: 34.7%
Bashkirs: 2.3%

References

Notes

Sources

 ]]

Districts of Perm Krai
States and territories established in 1931
1931 establishments in the Soviet Union
States and territories disestablished in 1963
States and territories established in 1965